Scoliacma virginea is a moth in the family Erebidae. It was described by George Thomas Bethune-Baker in 1908. It is found in New Guinea. The habitat consists of mountainous areas.

References

Moths described in 1908
Lithosiina